Popular Music  is a Swedish-Finnish comedy film which was released to cinemas in Sweden on 24 September 2004, based on the novel of the same name by Mikael Niemi.

Cast
Niklas Ulfvarson - Matti (age 7)
Max Endefors - Matti (15)
Tommy Vallikari - Niila (age 7)
Andreas af Enehielm - Niila (age 15)
Björn Kjellman - Greger
Göran Forsmark - Birger
Sten Ljunggren - Grandfather
Jarmo Mäkinen - Isak, father of Niila
Kati Outinen - Päivi, mother of Niila
Tarja-Tuulikki Tarsala - Grandmother
Eero Milonoff - Johan, brother of Niila
Ville Kivelä - Erkki
Fredrik Hammar - Ville
Lisa Lindgren - Signe, the teacher
Annika Marklund - The communist
 Johan Hanno - Roffe
Niklas Grönberg - Student
Mikael Niemi - Swedish narrator
Peter Franzén - Finnish narrator

External links

References

2004 comedy films
2004 films
Swedish comedy films
Finnish comedy films
Films set in Norrbotten
2000s Swedish films